The Columbia Inferno were an ECHL team based in Columbia, South Carolina.  Beginning in 2008, the team went on voluntary suspension awaiting construction of a new arena in suburban Lexington County, South Carolina. However, the ECHL dropped Columbia as a "future market" in June 2014. They played their home games at the Carolina Coliseum.

History
The Inferno first took the ice in 2001 as an expansion team after a group of physicians dubbed the "Hockey Docs" sought to purchase a team. While officially unaffiliated in their first season, the Inferno soon reached a working relationship with the Manitoba Moose of the American Hockey League that turned into a formal affiliation the following season and later with Manitoba's National Hockey League affiliate, the Vancouver Canucks. On July 10, 2006, the team announced the end of their affiliation with the Moose and Canucks and announced a new affiliation with the Toronto Marlies (AHL) and the Toronto Maple Leafs (NHL) two days later.

Demise
The Inferno was originally slated to move across the street to the Colonial Life Arena after the 2007–08 ECHL season, but legal issues with the arena's funding prevented the move. The team was voluntarily suspended for the 2008–09 season as the team was told that it could not be guaranteed a lease with the Carolina Coliseum in time to meet league requirements. The voluntary suspension was extended during subsequent seasons and, according to Joe Babik, the Director of Communications for the ECHL, included the 2012–13 season.

However, as of the 2013–14 season the team had not returned since its 2008 suspension. A March 2014 article in the Charleston-based The Post and Courier indicated team owner Ezra Riber was no longer required by the league to pay ECHL franchise fees. Acknowledging his long term personal and financial commitment to the league, the BOG voted that he cease paying dues while affirming their interest in Dr. Riber bringing hockey back to Columbia. The team was not included in the June 2014 ECHL realignment for the 2014–15 season. Columbia was removed as a "future market" by the ECHL shortly thereafter.

Season-by-season records
Note: GP = Games played, W = Wins, L = Losses, T = Ties, OTL = Overtime losses, Pts = Points, GF = Goals for, GA = Goals against, PIM = Penalties in minutes

Team captains
2007–2008
C – Brad Ralph
A – Patrick Wellar
A – Tyson Marsh
A – Mac Faulkner
A – Jeff Miles
A – Donny Grover
A – Steve McJannet
2006–2007
C – Chris Thompson
C – Brad Ralph
A – Mike Vellinga
A – Tyson Marsh
A – Jeff Miles
A – Brad Ralph
2005–2006
C – Jay Legault
A – Leon Hayward
A – Derek Eastman
2004–2005
C – Trevor Demmans
A – Brad Ralph
A – Matt Ulwelling
A – Kevin Hopke
A – Robin Carruthers
2003–2004
C – Barrie Moore
A – Dennis Vial
A – Sean Owens
A – Robin Carruthers
2002-2003
C – Barrie Moore
A – Dennis Vial
A – Corey Hessler

Coaching history

NHL alumni
Alex Auld
Eric Boulton
Alexandre Burrows
Fedor Fedorov
Alex Foster
Robert McVicar
Mike Minard
Brandon Nolan
Phil Oreskovic
Bryan Rodney
Jesse Schultz
Dennis Vial

Notable players
Patrick Couture (ECHL 2002–03 Second Team All-Star)
Tim Smith (ECHL 2003-04 Leading Scorer)
Rejean Stringer (ECHL 2002-03 Sportsmanship Award)

References

External links
 Columbia Inferno Official Homepage No longer working.
 Columbia Inferno Booster Club no longer working.
 ECHL Official Website

Defunct ECHL teams
Ice hockey teams in South Carolina
Toronto Maple Leafs minor league affiliates
Sports in Columbia, South Carolina
2001 establishments in South Carolina
Defunct ice hockey teams in the United States
Ice hockey clubs established in 2001
Ice hockey clubs disestablished in 2008
2008 disestablishments in South Carolina